Louis Bromfield High School was a high school in Perrysville, Ohio, USA.  It was a part of the Mohican Juvenile Correctional Facility.  All youth prisoners who did not have a high school degree were required to participate in the educational program.  The Mohican Juvenile Correctional Facility of the Ohio Department of Youth Services was closed in May 2010.

References

External links

 Correctional Facility Website

Defunct schools in Ohio
Educational institutions disestablished in 2010
2010 disestablishments in Ohio